Satta is a 2001 album by Boozoo Bajou, the dub musical duo from Germany noted for their distinct blend of Louisiana Creole sounds with island rhythms. It was their first studio album.

Track listing
 "Yma" – 6:29
 "Camioux" – 5:32
 "Night Over Manaus" – 6:19
 "Divers" – 5:02
 "Bakar" – 5:14
 "Down And Out" – 6:06
 "Yoruba Road" – 5:36
 "Under My Sensi" – 6:01
 "Lava" – 4:51
 "Satta" – 5:45

References

2001 albums